was a Japanese studio based in the Enoki Building in Shinjuku, Tokyo.

Enoki Films also had a North American division, established in 1986, headquartered in the Encino area of Los Angeles, California, United States called Enoki Films USA, Inc. Enoki Films USA acted as a middle-man between Japanese companies and American licensees such as 4Kids Entertainment and Saban. In May 2007 their content was provided as video on demand by Internet startup ReelTime.com (worldwide except Japan).

As of 2002 Enoki licensed anime but sub-licenses its licenses to various distributors instead of distributing them directly. Anime News Network wrote that "They generally only license TV shows that they hope to also license to TV broadcasters such as Cartoon Network, ABC Family and Fox Kids".

Some of the anime productions that were listed on Enoki's website are under alternate names and may list characters under different names as well. In many cases, when sub-licensed to anime home video companies, the original titles and character names have been restored. Enoki's translations of episode titles and scenarios may differ from those in the official release.

If Enoki's series had a separate movie or direct-to-video production, it is usually not licensed by Enoki, and the film or direct-to-video production may be licensed to a separate company than the series (as is the case with the Slayers movies and OVAs and the Utena movie).

Enoki Films' North American division is now defunct, since it brought its operations to an end in 2010.

In addition to distributing anime, Enoki Films USA also distributed puppet shows such as Peppermint Park and Star Fleet.

History
In 1975, Zen and Yoshi Enoki established Enoki Films Co., Ltd. in Tokyo. In 1980, they opened a liaison office in London, England, for European operations. In 1986 the California office opened; soon afterwards Yoshi Enoki opened the American division.

Anime licensed by Enoki Films USA

Some of the Enoki USA titles include:
 8 Man After
 Bistro Recipe (Fighting Foodons; produced with 4Kids Entertainment)
 Captain Tsubasa (under the titles Flash Kicker and Captain Tsubasa)
 Cosmo Warrior Zero (under the title Cosmowarrior Zero)
 Demon Lord Dante
 El-Hazard: The Wanderer
 Genshi-kun (Flint the Time Detective; produced with Saban)
 (Gensomaden) Saiyuki
 Gun Frontier
 Gokudo (as Jester the Adventurer)
 His and Her Circumstances (as Tales at North Hills High; released under original name)
 Honey Honey no Suteki na Bouken (as simply Honey Honey)
 Ikki Tousen
 Lolo the Penguin (Scamper the Penguin)
 Lost Universe
 Majuu Sensen: The Apocalypse (as Beast Fighter: The Apocalypse)
 Revolutionary Girl Utena (as Ursula's Kiss; released under original name)
 Slayers (as The Slayers)
 Totsugeki! Pappara-tai (as The X-treme Team)

Young anime of Enoki Films
Pokonyan!
Mojacko
Prince Mackaroo
Hello Kitty's Paradise
Petit Petit Anime
The Wonderful Galaxy of Oz
Flint the Time Detective
Tomatoman
Kappamaki
Mock & Sweet
Hikarian
Serendipity Stories: Friends of Pure Island
Serendipity the Pink Dragon
Dotakon

Anime available through Enoki Films
Enoki also list many other anime series on their website that are available for sub-licensing to other companies for release on home video. As yet, the following titles remain unlicensed by any other company and thus unavailable in English:

 The Adventures of Scamper the Penguin
 Firestorm (Gerry Anderson anime production)
 Forza! Hidemaru (as Forza! Mario)
 Galaxy Gale Baxingar (J-9 series two, as Cosmo Ranger)
 Galaxy Hurricane Sasuraiger (J-9 series three, as Wonder Six)
 Galaxy Whirlwind Braiger (J-9 series one, as Cosmo Runner)
 Giant Killing
 Hikarian
 Mission Outer Space Srungle (as Gorilla Force; previously licensed by Saban as part of "Macron 1" along with GoShogun)
 Ruins Legend Acrobunch
 Submarine Super 99
 Thumbelina

References

External links
 Official site
 

Anime companies
Companies disestablished in 2010
Entertainment companies based in California
Entertainment companies established in 1975
Entertainment companies of Japan
Film production companies of Japan
Mass media in Tokyo